Nils Stefansson (born 16 March 1957) is a Swedish bobsledder. He competed in the two man and the four man events at the 1984 Winter Olympics.

References

External links
 

1957 births
Living people
Swedish male bobsledders
Olympic bobsledders of Sweden
Bobsledders at the 1984 Winter Olympics
People from Sundsvall
Sportspeople from Västernorrland County
20th-century Swedish people